Mexico competed at the 1924 Summer Olympics in Paris, France. Fifteen competitors, all men, took part in 15 events in three sports.

Athletics

Eleven athletes represented Mexico in 1924. It was the nation's debut appearance in the sport.

Ranks given are within the heat.

Track & road events

Field events

Shooting

Two sport shooters represented Mexico in 1924. It was the nation's debut in the sport.

Tennis

 Men

References

External links
Official Olympic Reports

Nations at the 1924 Summer Olympics
1924
Olympics